Betchton is a civil parish in Cheshire East, England. It contains 18 buildings that are recorded in the National Heritage List for England as designated listed buildings. Of these, one is listed at Grade II*, the middle grade, and the others are at Grade II. The parish is almost entirely rural. Many of the listed buildings are timber-framed farmhouses dating from the 16th and 17th centuries. The Trent and Mersey Canal runs through the parish, and eight structures associated with this are listed, namely four bridges, two locks, and two mileposts. The other listed buildings are structures associated with the farmhouses, a country house, and a public house.

Key

Buildings

See also
 Listed buildings in Alsager

 Listed buildings in Church Lawton
 Listed buildings in Hassall
 Listed buildings in Odd Rode
 Listed buildings in Sandbach
 Listed buildings in Smallwood

References
Citations

Sources

 

Listed buildings in the Borough of Cheshire East
Lists of listed buildings in Cheshire